WIPP may refer to:

 Waste Isolation Pilot Plant, a deep geological repository for nuclear waste
 Women in Periodical Publishing (today known as Exceptional Women in Publishing)
 The ICAO airport code assigned for Sultan Mahmud Badaruddin II International Airport in Palembang, Indonesia